Howard Winfield Morgan Jr. (May 1, 1930 – July 22, 2021) was a weather forecaster for Albuquerque, New Mexico television station KOAT-TV, Holdrege, Nebraska station KHOL-TV, and other stations in Kansas and Utah. He was known as "Uncle Howdy" during children's programming in all four states.

Morgan was born in Baumstown, Pennsylvania.

Morgan started his career as a graphic artist at KHOL-TV, and in 1953, became a weather forecaster there.

Morgan first drew "Thermo," his trademark drawing of the Sun with eyes and a smile, on his second day of weather forecasts at KHOL. He used Thermo for most of his weather forecasts until greenscreens and computer graphics became the norm for weather broadcasts.

In the mid 1950s, he moved to Albuquerque, New Mexico to work at KOAT. He briefly took a job in Utah in the late 1960s, but returned to KOAT in 1971.

While at KOAT, Morgan did a regular series of reports called "Gardenlore."

He retired from KOAT in November 1999 after a 46-year career. He can still be seen in commercials as a spokesperson for an Albuquerque window manufacturer. He also appears in an ad for hearing aids.

Howard Morgan died on July 22, 2021, at the age of 91.

Books
Howard Morgan, based on Gardenlore, wrote three books:

Howard Morgan's Gardenlore (1979), Library of Congress number (LCCN) 79083491
Howard Morgan's More from Gardenlore (1981)
Howard Morgan's Even More from Gardenlore (1981), LCCN 80085145

All three were published by KOAT.

References

Reed Jr., Ollie. So long, Uncle Howdy, Albuquerque Tribune, 29 November 1999 
Weather Forecaster Focuses on Art, Albuquerque Journal, 12 December 2001 

1930 births
2021 deaths
American television journalists
People from Albuquerque, New Mexico
People from Berks County, Pennsylvania
American male journalists
Journalists from Pennsylvania